Bo Caldwell (born 1955) is the author of the national bestseller The Distant Land of My Father (2002), and The City of Tranquil Light (2011). The former was the selection for Silicon Valley Reads 2008. Her short fiction has been published in Ploughshares, Story, Epoch, and other literary journals. A former Stegner Fellow in Creative Writing at Stanford University, she lives in Northern California with her husband, Ron Hansen, and her two children.

References

1955 births
Living people
American women writers
Stegner Fellows
21st-century American women